Luke Nosek (born 1975/1976) is a Polish-American entrepreneur, notable for being a co-founder of PayPal.

Biography
Łukasz Nosek was born in Tarnów, Poland. After emigrating to the US, he earned a B.S. in Computer Engineering from the University of Illinois at Urbana–Champaign.

In the summer of 1995, while still in college, he co-founded SponsorNet New Media, Inc., along with fellow Illinois students Max Levchin and Scott Banister. Nosek then worked for Netscape. In 1998, with Max Levchin, Peter Thiel, Elon Musk, and Ken Howery, Nosek co-founded PayPal, serving as vice president of marketing and strategy, creating the company's "instant transfer" product.

In his first conversation with Thiel, he told Thiel he had just registered to be cryonically suspended, in other words, that he would be subject to low-temperature preservation in case of his legal death in hopes that he might be successfully revived by future medical technology. Thiel himself would later follow Nosek's example.

After PayPal went public and was sold to eBay for $1.5 billion in 2002, Nosek left the company to travel and pursue angel investing. In 2005, with Thiel and Ken Howery, he started Founders Fund, a San Francisco-based venture capital firm with over $1 billion under management.

In July 2017, Nosek left Founders Fund to launch Gigafund, an investment fund focused on space exploration.

Nosek was the first institutional investor in Elon Musk's  SpaceX, and sits on the company's board. He also sits on the board of ResearchGate.

References

External links
 

1970s births
Living people
Angel investors
American technology company founders
American corporate directors
Computer programmers
People from Tarnów
PayPal people
Polish emigrants to the United States
Grainger College of Engineering alumni
21st-century American businesspeople